The 2022 Latvian Football Cup, kbown as the ‘’’Responsible Gaming Latvian Cup’’’ for sponsorship reasons, was a single elimination association football tournament which began on 6 May 2022.

Preliminary round
Six preliminary round matches were played between 6 May and 8 May 2022.

|}

First round
Fourteen first round matches were played on 21-22 May 2022.

|}

Second round
Twelve second round matches were played on 11–12 June 2022.

|}

Play-off round
Six Play-off Round matches were played on 22-26 June 2022.

|}

Round of 16
Eight Round of 16 matches were played on 9–11 July 2022.

|}

Quarter–finals
The quarter–finals were played on 13–14 August 2022.

|}

Semi–finals
The semi–finals were played on 19 September 2022.

|}

Final
The final was played on 19 October 2022.

See also
 2022 Latvian Higher League

References

External links 
 LFF.lv
 uefa.com

Latvian Football Cup seasons
Latvian Football Cup
2022 in Latvian football